Ranger High School is a public high school located in Ranger, Texas, United States and classified as a 1A school by the UIL. It is part of the Ranger Independent School District located in eastern Eastland County. In 2011, the school was rated "Met Standard" by the Texas Education Agency.

Athletics
The Ranger Bulldogs compete in the following sports 

Baseball
Basketball
Cross Country
Football
Golf
Softball
Track and Field
Volleyball

State Titles
Football 
1953(1A)
Boys Golf 
1956(B)

Notable Alumnus
Walter Prescott Webb (1888-1963), historian of the American West and author of the classic The Great Plains (1931)

See also
 1935 Sun Bowl

References

External links
Ranger ISD

Public high schools in Texas
Schools in Eastland County, Texas